Christopher Keith Riley, SDB  is an Australian Roman Catholic priest.  He is a member of the Salesian order and the founder and CEO of the charity Youth Off The Streets. On 3 April 2021, the Sydney Morning Herald reported that Father Riley was gravely ill with a variety of ailments.

Early years

Riley was born in Echuca, Victoria in 1954 and grew up on a dairy farm in the district. In 1973 he graduated from a school run by the Salesians. He was inspired by the movie Boys Town and went on to train as a teacher. He has worked as a teacher, youth worker, probation officer, residential care worker and principal of the charity Boy's Town. In 1982 he was ordained a priest at Oakleigh, Victoria.

Riley is the founder and CEO of Youth Off The Streets and has worked with disadvantaged youth for more than 35 years in a variety of roles including teacher, youth worker, probation officer, residential carer and principal. He officially founded Youth Off The Streets in 1991.

As CEO of Youth Off The Streets, Riley oversees the operation of over 25 programs which employ over 180 staff and involve more than 250 volunteers. He has implemented innovative behaviour modification strategies to help young people deal with a history of trauma, abuse and neglect. Many of these strategies have been adopted by schools across Australia and by government agencies. Riley believes there is no such thing as a "child born bad", but acknowledges that there are bad environments, circumstances and families that impact negatively on our young. "We must have the courage to demand greatness from our youth".

Youth Off The Streets
Riley founded Youth Off The Streets (YOTS) in 1991 with a food van delivering meals to homeless youth in the Kings Cross area in Sydney. Since then the organisation has grown to offer more than 35 services, including aboriginal programs, crisis accommodation, alcohol and other drug services, counselling, accredited high schools, outreach, residential programs and a mentoring program. The organisation is non-denominational and works for young people who are homeless, drug dependent and recovering from abuse.

Riley makes frequent media appearances on behalf of YOTS, including a weekly radio segment broadcast on 2UE in Sydney and 2CC in Canberra.

Attitude towards gambling
In the decade from 2000 to 2009, Youth Off The Streets received $3.5 million in donations from the Australian gambling industry, particularly poker machines.

Riley lobbied against the taxation of gambling, stating that "the Government won't fund services like mine and are now also attacking the revenues that we previously did have available." With respect to his position on the effect of gambling on society, in 2003 he stated in a radio interview, "I acknowledge that the great problem facing the community is people who are addicted to gambling and I call for the clubs to put in place systems and supports to help people fight this addiction."

In December 2011, it was revealed that Riley had lent his name in support of a campaign by Clubs Australia against proposed mandatory precommitment limits for poker machines. Riley expressed his concern saying that a better way to tackle problem gambling was treatment and counselling, not legislation.

Awards and honours
In 2006, Riley was appointed a Member of the Order of Australia for service to disadvantaged youth through the establishment of Youth Off The Streets and the development of a range of assistance and mentoring initiatives for adolescents and to the welfare of children overseas through humanitarian assistance efforts. In 2006, he also received the Human Rights Medal from the then Human Rights and Equal Opportunity Commission (shared with broadcaster Phillip Adams).

On 20 April 2010, Riley was awarded an honorary doctorate by the University of Western Sydney in recognition of his work.

In 2012, Riley was nominated as NSW Australian of the Year for his work with disadvantaged youth.

References

External links
 Youth Off The Streets website 
 Inside access with Fr Chris Riley: Youth Off the Streets - an interview with Riley, published in Bellaboobaba on 9 June 2008
 Teen life: hope on the street - an article about Key College founded by Riley, published in Bellaboobaba on 10 June 2008

Australian Roman Catholic priests
Salesians of Don Bosco
Members of the Order of Australia
1954 births
Probation and parole officers
Living people
Date of birth missing (living people)
People from Echuca
University of Divinity alumni